Parmaksız can refer to:

 Parmaksız, Çat
 Parmaksız, Hınıs